Israel Luna López (born 23 March 2002) is a Mexican professional footballer who plays as an attacking midfielder for Liga MX club Pachuca.

International career

Youth
Luna was part of the under-17 side that participated at the 2019 CONCACAF U-17 Championship, where Mexico won the competition. He was included in the Best XI of the tournament. Luna also participated at the 2019 U-17 World Cup, where Mexico finished runner-up.

Career statistics

Club

Honours
Pachuca
Liga MX: Apertura 2022

Mexico U17
CONCACAF U-17 Championship: 2019
FIFA U-17 World Cup runner-up: 2019

Individual
CONCACAF U-17 Championship Golden Ball: 2019
CONCACAF U-17 Championship Best XI: 2019

References

External links
 
 
 

2002 births
Living people
Mexico youth international footballers
Association football midfielders
Liga MX players
C.F. Pachuca players
Footballers from San Luis Potosí
People from San Luis Potosí City
Mexican footballers